Sanquin District 1 is one of 16 districts of Sinoe County, Liberia. As of 2008, the population was 2,118.

References

Districts of Liberia
Sinoe County